Abu Sulayman Banakati (died 1330), was a Persian historian and poet, who lived during the late Ilkhanate era. He is principally known for his world history book, the Rawdat uli al-albab fi maʿrifat al-tawarikh wa al-ansab, better known as Tarikh-i Banakati.

Banakati was also associated with the court of the Ilkhanate. He himself reports that he served as the chief poet at the court of the Ilkhanid ruler Ghazan in 1302.

Biography 
Banakati was born in Banakat (later known as Shahrukhiya), a town in Transoxiana. His laqab (honorific name) was Fakhr al-Din Banakati. He belonged to a family of scholars, and was the son of the religious scholar Taj al-Din Abu al-Fadl Banakati, who is notable for writing the Kitab al-maysur. Banakati also had a brother named Nizam al-Din Ali Banakati, who was a prominent Sufi. Banakati was a well-read scholar and skilled poet; according to his own reports, he served as the chief poet at the court of the Ilkhanid ruler Ghazan in 1302. During the summer of that year, Banakati was given the title of malik al-shuʿara (King of Poets) by Ghazan. Banakati reports that he became chief poet due to his brother being the previous holder of the office. Al-Baghdadi credits Banakati with the composition of a diwan. A sample of Banakati's poetry is mentioned in the Tadhkirat al-shu'ara ("Memorial of poets"), a biographical dictionary written by Dawlatshah Samarqandi (died 1495/1507).

Works 
Banakati is principally known for his world history book, the Rawdat uli al-albab fi maʿrifat al-tawarikh wa al-ansab, better known as Tarikh-i Banakati. The work was completed on 31 December 1317, and is divided into nine segments: (1) the prophets and patriarchs; (2) the monarchs of ancient Iran; (3) the prophet Muhammad and the caliphate; (4) Iranian dynasties that existed in the same period as the Abbasid Caliphate; (5) the Jews; (6) the Christians and the Franks; (7) the Indians; (8) the Chinese; and (9) the Mongols. The book ends with the start of the reign of the last Ilkhanid ruler, Abu Sa'id Bahadur Khan. The last portion of part nine, which covers information from 1304 to 1317, is regarded as the first source on the reign of Öljaitü.

Banakati states that most of the work is a shortened version of the world history book Jami' al-tawarikh by Rashid al-Din Hamadani (died 1318). As reported by some scholars, Banakati was able to add noticeably important information to his work due to his prominent position at the Mongol court. Regardless of the briefness of the book, it is considered both unbiased and valuable, as well as one of the most reliable sources of its time. The Tarikh-i Banakati was first published in 1678, when its eighth part ("The History of the Chinese") was translated into Latin as Abdallae Beidavaei historia Sinensis by the German sinologist , who mistook it as a work by the Persian scholar Qadi Baydawi (died 1319), probably due to a copyist including it as another work by Baydawi. The Latin translation of the book was later translated into English by Stephen Weston and released in London in 1820. The French writer Quatremère de Quincy (died 1849) included the work in his book, the Histoire des Mongols de la Perse.

Dawlatshah states that no other historian has written as much about China, India, the Jews and the Byzantines as Banakati has.

By including some of his own words, Banakati noticeably portrays Ghazan as a more pious figure, which testifies to the amalgamation of Mongol and Islamic ideas that was taking place at the time. Similar to other poets, Banakati utilizes both Iranian and Central Asian notions and titles of kingship. He refers to the Mongol ruler as Pādshāh, the Khusrav, and the Ṣāḥib-Qirān, but also as Khaqan (Qa’an) and Khan of Khans.

References

Sources 
 
 
 
 
 

Ilkhanate historians
Ilkhanate-period poets
13th-century births
1330 deaths
14th-century Iranian people